The 1969 Paris–Tours was the 63rd edition of the Paris–Tours cycle race and was held on 29 September 1969. The race started in Paris and finished in Tours. The race was won by Herman Van Springel.

General classification

References

1969 in French sport
1969
1969 Super Prestige Pernod
September 1969 sports events in Europe